Walter Ross Wade (1810–1862) was an American physician and planter in the Antebellum South. He owned the Rosswood Plantation, a cotton plantation in Jefferson County, Mississippi. His diary was published posthumously.

Biography

Early life
Walter Ross Wade was born in 1810 in South Carolina. His father was Daniel Wade and his mother, Jean Brown Ross. His maternal grandfather was Isaac Ross, the first owner of the Prospect Hill Plantation.

Career
He worked as a physician, treating patients in the Natchez District. He kept a diary of his patient visits and other activities.

He purchased the Rosswood Plantation, a 1,250-acre cotton plantation in Jefferson County, Mississippi. He owned more than 100 African slaves who picked cotton in the fields. In 1857, he hired architect David Schroeder to design the Greek Revival mansion. It was built as a gift for his second wife. The Wades entertained guests regularly and went fox-hunting on the grounds. During the American Civil War of 1861–1865, they invited the Confederate States Army to use the mansion as a Confederate hospital.

Personal life
He married a cousin, Martha Taylor Wade. They had two children. After she died, he married Mabella Jane Duncan Chamberlain, and they also had two children.

Death
He died in 1862.

Legacy
His diary was published posthumously. In 2003, it was recorded as an audio book on a CD.

References

1810 births
1862 deaths
People from South Carolina
People from Jefferson County, Mississippi
Physicians from Mississippi
American planters
American diarists
American slave owners
19th-century diarists